Mia is a feminine given name, originating as a hypocoristic of various unrelated names.

It is usually derived from the name Maria and its variants (Miriam, Maryam, Mary), but it is reportedly also used as a hypocoristic of names such as Amalia, Amelia, Emilia,  Emily, Salome (Solomia) or Maya.

The name has been popularly associated with the Italian word  and the Spanish word , both meaning 'mine', and also recognized as a derivation from the Slavic word , meaning "dear, darling".

Popularity

Long in use as a hypocoristic, Mia is recorded as an officially given name in the United States in the 1960s, and it rose to popularity in the 1990s to 2010s, from rank 316 in 1994 to rank 30 in 2004 and further to rank 6 in 2013–2015.
Similarly, it reached rank 7 in Australia as of 2013.

Notable individuals

Given name
 Mia Alvar, Filipino-American writer based in New York
 Mia Boman (born 1975), Swedish curler and curling coach
 Mia Brownell (born 1971), American visual artist
 Mia Davies (born 1978), Australian politician
 Mia Goth (born 1993), English actress
 Mia Hagman (born 1979), Finnish breaststroke swimmer
 Mia Hamm (born 1972), American retired professional soccer player
 Mia Khalifa, former pornographic actress
 Mia Kilburg (born 1989), American speed skater and professional racing cyclist
 Mia Kirshner (born 1975), Canadian actress
 Mia Mamede (born 1995), Brazilian model, actress and beauty pageant titleholder
 Mia May (1884–1980), Austrian actress
 Mia Michaels (born 1966), American choreographer
 Mia Mottley (born 1965), Barbadian Prime Minister
 Mia Newley (born 1988), Australian basketball player
 Mia Pojatina (born 1995), Croatian model
 Mia Sara (born 1967), American actress
 Mia Strömmer (born 1974), Finnish hammer thrower
 Mia Tyler (born 1978), American actress
 Mia Wray (born 1995), Australian pop singer-songwriter
 Mia Wasikowska (born 1989), Australian actress
 Mia Zapata (1965–1993), American musician
 Mia Zutter (born 1999), American Paralympic athlete who competes in Nordic skiing

Hypocoristic
 Mia Aegerter (Myriam), Swiss pop singer and actress
 Mia Farrow (María), American actress
 Mia Hamm (Mariel Margaret), American soccer (football) player
 Mia Matthes (Mariette, 1920–2010), Canadian photographer
 Mia Rose (Maria), British-Portuguese singer

Pseudonyms
 Mia (singer), Lithuanian singer and television presenter
 Mia Martini, pseudonym of Domenica Berté, Italian singer
 Mia Murano (未亜), Japanese model and actress
 Mia X, American rapper, singer-songwriter and actress

Fictional characters
 Baby Mia, Molly's baby sister that first appears in "Bubble Baby!" in the American animated television series Bubble Guppies.
 Mia, a character in the British web series Corner Shop Show
 Mia (.hack)
 Mia (Dark Tower)
 Mia, a lead character from Lego Friends
 Mia, the titular character from Mia and Me
 Mia, a character in the 2016 American film La La Land
 Mia, a Fire Emblem: Path of Radiance character
 Mia, a Golden Sun character
 Mia, a mouse, the lead character in Mia's Big Adventure Collection educational software series
 Mia (Two and a Half Men), a character on the television show Two and a Half Men
 Mia Smoak-Queen, a character on the tv show Arrow
 Mia Allen, a character from The Evil Dead
 Mia Ausa, a Lunar: Silver Star Story Complete character
 Mia Dearden, a comic book character
 Mía Colucci, a character in the Argentine  (2002–03)
 Mía Colucci, a character in the Mexican  (2004–06)
 Mia Elliott, a character on the American soap opera Love Is a Many Splendored Thing
 Mia Fey, a Phoenix Wright character
 Mia Hall, main character of novel and film of If I Stay
 Mia Havero, main character and narrator of Alexei Panshin's 1968 Nebula Award-winning novel Rite of Passage
 Mia Jones, a Degrassi: The Next Generation character
 Mia Lewis, a character in the TV series Californication
 Mia Rio, a character in Yandere Simulator
 Mia St. Clair, an American Girl character
 Mia Thermopolis, a main character in The Princess Diaries and The Princess Diaries 2: Royal Engagement
 Mia Toretto, a main character in The Fast and The Furious
 Mia Townsend, a Need for Speed: Most Wanted character
 Mia Wallace, a Pulp Fiction character
 Mia Warren, a character in Celeste Ng's 2017 novel Little Fires Everywhere and in the 2020 miniseries of the same name
 Mia Watanabe, a character from Power Rangers Samurai
 Mia Karnstein, a character from Code Vein
 Mia the Kitten, a character in the American animated television series T.O.T.S..

See also 
 
 Pia Mia (born 1996), American singer, songwriter, model, and actress
 Mia (surname)

References

English feminine given names
Hebrew feminine given names
Scandinavian feminine given names